Chalab-e Sofla (also Romanized as Chālāb-e Soflá) is a village in Sang Sefid Rural District, Qareh Chay District, Khondab County, Markazi Province, Iran. At the 2006 census, its population was 62, in 16 families.

References 

Populated places in Khondab County